Bose Samuel is a Nigerian freestyle wrestler. She is a silver medalist at the African Games and a bronze medalist at the Commonwealth Games.

Career 

She won the bronze medal in the women's freestyle 53 kg event at the 2018 Commonwealth Games held in Gold Coast, Australia. In 2019, she represented Nigeria at the African Games held in Rabat, Morocco and she won the silver medal in the women's freestyle 53 kg event.

In 2020, she won the silver medal in the women's freestyle 53 kg event at the African Wrestling Championships held in Algiers, Algeria. She competed at the 2021 African & Oceania Wrestling Olympic Qualification Tournament hoping to qualify for the 2020 Summer Olympics in Tokyo, Japan.

Major results

References

External links 
 

Living people
Year of birth missing (living people)
Place of birth missing (living people)
Nigerian female sport wrestlers
Wrestlers at the 2018 Commonwealth Games
Commonwealth Games medallists in wrestling
Commonwealth Games bronze medallists for Nigeria
African Games silver medalists for Nigeria
African Games medalists in wrestling
Competitors at the 2019 African Games
African Wrestling Championships medalists
21st-century Nigerian women
Medallists at the 2018 Commonwealth Games